The Iowa Building is an historic structure located in downtown Cedar Rapids, Iowa, United States.   It was individually listed on the National Register of Historic Places in 1983.  In 2015 it was included as a contributing property in the Cedar Rapids Central Business District Commercial Historic District.

History
Seven construction workers were killed in 1913 when the top two floors collapsed during construction. The building was completed the following year. It housed a millinery company named the Lyman Company until the building was bought and renamed in 1933.

References

Commercial buildings completed in 1914
Renaissance Revival architecture in Iowa
Buildings and structures in Cedar Rapids, Iowa
National Register of Historic Places in Cedar Rapids, Iowa
Office buildings on the National Register of Historic Places in Iowa
Office buildings in Iowa
Individually listed contributing properties to historic districts on the National Register in Iowa